The national flag of Libya was originally introduced in 1951, following the creation of the Kingdom of Libya. It was designed by Omar Faiek Shennib and approved by King Idris Al Senussi who comprised the UN delegation representing the three regions of Cyrenaica, Fezzan, and Tripolitania at UN unification discussions. 

The flag was abolished following the fall of the Kingdom in 1969, and the dictator Muammar al-Gaddafi had implemented a few other different flags since then, but it was ultimately readapted by the National Transitional Council following the fall of Gaddafi on August 3, 2011.

The flag consists of a triband red-black-green design, the central black band being twice the width of the outer bands. A white star and crescent is located in the center of the flag.

History

The first Libyan flag design was based on the banner of the Senussi dynasty from Cyrenaica, which consisted of a black field and star and crescent design, and was later used as the flag of the region.

Omar Faiek Shennib, Chief of the Royal Diwans, Vice President of the National Assembly and Minister of Defense under King Idris Al Senussi is credited in the memoirs of Adrian Pelt, UN commissioner for Libya (1949 to 1951) for the design of the original flag of Libya.
According to Pelt:
"during deliberations of the Libyan National Constitutional Convention, a paper drawing of a proposed national flag was presented to the convention by Omar Faiek Shennib (distinguished member of the delegation from Cyrenaica). The design was composed of three colors: red, black and green, with a white crescent and star centered in the middle black stripe. Mr. Shennib informed the delegates that this design had met the approval of His Highness Emir of Cyrenaica, King Idris Al Senussi (later to become King of Libya). The assembly subsequently approved that design."

This flag represented Libya from its independence in 1951 until the 1969 Libyan coup d'état. The symbolism of the star and crescent in the flag of the Kingdom of Libya was explained in an English language booklet, The Libyan Flag & The National Anthem, issued by the Ministry of Information and Guidance of the Kingdom of Libya (year unknown) as follows: "The crescent is symbolic of the beginning of the lunar month according to the Muslim calendar. It brings back to our minds the story of Hijra [migration] of our Prophet Mohammed from his home in order to spread Islam and teach the principles of right and virtue. The Star represents our smiling hope, the beauty of aim and object and the light of our belief in God, in our country, its dignity and honour which illuminate our way and puts an end to darkness."

In 2011, interviews with Ibtisam Shennib and Amal Omar Shennib, Omar Faeik Shennib's only two remaining children, were cited as confirming Pelt's account of the origin of the flag. 
Ibtisam Shennib recalled the morning her father brought a draft of the flag to the breakfast table and showed it to her and her siblings, explaining the original intent behind the selection of the flag's colours and symbols. According to Omar Faiek Shennib, "red was selected for the blood sacrificed for the freedom of Libya, black to remember the dark days that Libyans lived under the occupation of the Italians and green to represent its primary wealth, agriculture, [Libya once being referred to as the 'agricultural basket' or 'breadbasket' of the Ottoman Empire] and the future prosperity of the country. The star and crescent were placed within the black central strip of the flag as a reference to the Senussi flag and the role of King Idris in leading the country to independence". The flag's colours also echo the colours of the flags of the three regions of Libya: Fezzan (red), Cyrenaica (black), and Tripolitania (green).

Under Muammar Gaddafi's dictatorship, Libya had a red-white-black flag from 1969 to 1977, and it was replaced by the all-green flag from 1977 to 2011, during which it was the only flag in the world to have one color and no design. 

During the Libyan Civil War against the rule of Muammar Gaddafi, the 1951–69 flag – as well as various makeshift versions without the crescent and star symbol, or without the green stripe – came back into use in areas held by the Libyan opposition and by protesters at several Libyan diplomatic missions abroad.
The National Transitional Council, formed on 27 February 2011, adopted the flag previously used in the Kingdom of Libya between 1951 and 1969 as the "emblem of the Libyan Republic". The flag was officially defined in article three of the Libyan Draft Constitutional Charter for the Transitional Stage:

The national flag shall have the following shape and dimensions:

Its length shall be double its width, its shall be divided into three parallel coloured stripes, the uppermost being red, the centre black and lowest green, the black stripe shall be equal in area to the other two stripes together and shall bear in its centre a white crescent, between the two extremities of which there shall be a five-pointed white star.

On 10 March 2011, France was the first country to recognise the council as the official government of Libya, as well as the first to allow the Libyan embassy staff to raise the flag. On 21 March, the flag was flown by the Permanent Mission of Libya to the United Nations and appeared on their official website, and thereafter in late August by the Arab League and by Libya's own telecommunications authority, the Libya Telecom & Technology, on its own website. In the following months many other Libyan embassies replaced the green flag of Gaddafi with the tricolour flag.

This original flag of Libya is now the only flag used by the United Nations to represent Libya, according to the following UN statement: 
"Following the adoption by the General Assembly of resolution 66/1, the Permanent Mission of Libya to the United Nations formally notified the United Nations of a Declaration by the National Transitional Council of 3 August 2011 changing the official name of the Libyan Arab Jamahiriya to 'Libya' as well as a decision to change Libya's national flag to the original." All Libyan diplomatic posts, such as embassies and consulates, use the original flag of Libya.

Legal basis and construction
 
The flag of Libya is described in Article 7 of the Constitution of 7 October 1951. It was officially adopted on 24 December 1951. The passage from the constitution reads:

Both the precise shade and legal construction is described in a booklet issued by the Ministry of Information and Guidance of the Kingdom of Libya in 1951. The passage reads:

Colours scheme

Other flags

Historical flags

See also
 Coat of arms of Libya
 National Anthem of Libya

References

Libya
Libya
Libya
Libya
National symbols of Libya
Libya
1951 establishments in Libya
1969 disestablishments in Libya
2011 establishments in Libya